The Citroën C3 Rally2 (originally known as the Citroën C3 R5) is a rally car built by Citroën World Rally Team. It is based upon the Citroën C3 road car and is built to R5 regulations. The car made its début at the 2018 Tour de Corse where it was driven by the French crews of Stéphane Lefebvre and Gabin Moreau, and Yoann Bonato and Benjamin Boulloud.

Background
In early 2017, Citroën began the development of the C3 R5. The C3 would be designed to improve on the previous offerings of Groupe PSA in the R5 discipline, the Peugeot 208 T16 and the Citroën DS3 R5, both of which proved problematic and unpopular with R5 customers. The C3 had little relation to its predecessor, the DS3.

Development
Throughout summer 2017, Citroën Racing Technologies employed factory Citroën drivers Stéphane Lefebvre and Craig Breen as part of the development team for the C3, along with Yoann Bonato, who was hired for the project. The first working model was completed in September of 2017, and a month later the test C3 made its public debut at the Rallye du Var, with Bonato driving a few stages as a non-competitive entrant to the rally.

Competition
The Citroën C3 R5 passed international homologation on 1 January 2018, and was now ready for competition. It made its competitive rallying debut at the Tour de Corse in April of that year, with Yoann Bonato taking second place in the WRC-2 class, and 10th overall in the rally.

Including the original test cars, a total of 26 C3 R5s had been constructed by 1 May 2019, with 22 having been sold to independent teams. In the hands of Yoann Bonato, the C3 R5 won the French Rally Championship in 2018, and continues to be used by the Citroën World Rally Team in the WRC-2 Pro class of the World Rally Championship, in the hands of Mads Østberg. Østberg would give the C3 R5 its first World Championship-level victory at the 2019 Rally Argentina. Although Citroën withdrew from the World Rally Championship in 2020, it continued as a manufacturer team in the WRC-2 and made the C3 R5 available to privateer teams in the WRC-3.

The C3 R5 was renamed the Citroën C3 Rally2 ahead of the 2021 championships.

Rally results

World Rally Championship-2 Pro victories

World Rally Championship-2 victories

World Rally Championship-3 victories

European Rally Championship victories

WRC-2 Pro results - factory team

WRC-2 Results - third party entrants

- * scored points with different entries.
- ** season still in progress.

See also

 Citroën C3 WRC
 Group R
 Ford Fiesta R5
 Hyundai i20 R5
 Škoda Fabia R5
 Volkswagen Polo GTI R5

References

External links
 Rally results of Citroën C3 R5

All-wheel-drive vehicles
Citroën vehicles
R5 cars
Rally2 cars